Lenjan County Mass Transit Organization is a public transport agency running Transit buses in Lenjan County, located in southeastern Isfahan city, in Greater Isfahan Region, Central Iran. The organization serves the cities of Zarrinshahr, Fuladshahr, Sedeh Lenjan, Chamgardan, Varnamkhast, Zayandeh Rud, Charmahin, and Bagh-e Bahadoran.

Fleets per city

References

Bus transport in Iran
Transport in Isfahan